Mount Monteagle is a high, sharp peak,  high, standing  north of Cape Sibbald in the Mountaineer Range of Victoria Land, Antarctica. It surmounts Aviator Glacier to the west and the large cirque of Parker Glacier to the east. The mountain was discovered in January 1841 by Sir James Clark Ross who named this peak for Thomas Spring Rice, 1st Baron Monteagle of Brandon, Chancellor of the Exchequer from 1835 to 1839.

References

Mountains of Victoria Land
Mountaineer Range
Borchgrevink Coast